The DRESDEN to RIESA series of early German steam engines, were tender locomotives operated by the Leipzig–Dresden Railway Company (LDE).

History 
The three locomotives were delivered in 1844 and 1846 to the LDE by Hawthorn of Newcastle upon Tyne, England. They were christened DRESDEN, LEIPZIG and RIESA.

The locomotives were retired between 1861 and 1867.

See also 
 Royal Saxon State Railways
 List of Saxon locomotives and railbuses
 Saxonia (locomotive)
 Leipzig–Dresden Railway Company

Sources 
 
 

2-4-0 locomotives
Locomotives of Saxony
Hawthorn locomotives
Railway locomotives introduced in 1844
Standard gauge locomotives of Germany

Passenger locomotives